Rafael Barrientos may refer to:

 Rafael Barrientos (musician) (1919–2008), Salvadoran musician and composer
 Rafael Barrientos (footballer) (born 1979), Salvadoran footballer